Goramanda is a village in Y. Ramavaram Mandal, East Godavari district in the state of Andhra Pradesh in India.

Demographics 
 India census, This Village had a population of 80, out of which 41 were male and 39 were female. Population of children below 6 years of age were 20%. The literacy rate of the village is 19%.

References 

Villages in Y. Ramavaram mandal